Firozabad railway station is on the Delhi-kanpur section of Delhi-Howarah Main line and Howrah–Gaya–Delhi line. It is located in Firozabad district in the Indian state of Uttar Pradesh. It serves Firozabad.

History
Through trains started running on the East Indian Railway Company's  Howrah–Delhi line in 1866.

Trains
20801/02 Magadh Express CANCELED
14217/18 Unchahar Express
15483/84 Mahananda Express
12311/12 Kalka Mail
18101/02 Muri Express
12419/20 Gomti Express
14163/64 Sangam Express
13483/84 Farakka Express (via Faizabad)
15707/08 Amrapali Express
14723/24 Kalindi Express
12875/76 Neelachal Express
12395/96 Ziyarat Express
18631/32 Ranchi–Ajmer Garib Nawaz Express
13007/08 Udyan Abha Toofan Express
12179/08 Lucknow–Agra Fort Intercity Express
19037/38 Bandra Terminus–Gorakhpur Avadh Express

Electrification
The Panki–Tundla sector was electrified in 1971–72.

Amenities
Firozabad railway station has one double-bedded non-AC retiring room. It also has a light refreshment stall and a book stall.

See also
Firozabad rail disaster

References

External links
 Trains at Firozabad

Railway stations in Firozabad district
Allahabad railway division
Firozabad